Scythris pseudarachnodes is a moth of the family Scythrididae. It was described by Bengt Å. Bengtsson in 1997. It is found on the Canary Islands (Tenerife).

Etymology
The species name refers to the similar species Scythris arachnodes plus Latin pseudo (meaning false).

References

pseudarachnodes
Moths described in 1997
Moths of Africa